Faizul Hasan Ibn-e-Faizi (1 July 1923 – 17 January 2009), also known by the pen name of Fiza, was a modern Urdu and Persian poet. He was a native of Mau district of Uttar Pradesh and is considered a 'qadir-ul-kalaam' poet and had received numerous awards within the Urdu world. At least, six poetry collections of Faizi had been published and acclaimed.

Personal life

Background
Fiza Ibn-e-Faizi was born in Doman Pura, Mau and studied in Jamia Islamiya Faiz-e-Aam, Mau and graduated in Urdu literature and Islamic jurisprudence. Having been born into a poor weaving family, he was unable to further his education. He had avocations of weaving and saying poetry. For few years, he taught in his alma mater. In 2008, the municipal head of his native city built a memorial gate, Faizi Gate near his house. In 2009, Faizi died after a prolonged illness.

See also
 Ahmad Faraz
 Ghalib
 Abul Kalam Azad

References

Further reading
 Data India. Press Institute of India; 2000.
 Indian Scholar. J. Srihari Rao; 1981.
 National Seminar on Ali Sardar Jafri held at Mau. Muslim Mirror. 10 June 2013.
 ʻAlī Javād Zaidī; Sahitya Akademi. A History of Urdu literature. Sahitya Akademi; 1 January 1993. .

Urdu-language poets
1923 births
2009 deaths
Persian-language poets
People from Mau
20th-century poets